A list of films produced in the Soviet Union in 1947 (see 1947 in film).

1947

See also
1947 in the Soviet Union

External links
 Soviet films of 1947 at the Internet Movie Database

1947
Soviet
Films